Elections for the 2019 European Parliament election in Luxembourg were held on 26 May 2019. Ten parties contested the election for Luxembourg's six seats in the European Parliament.

The Democratic Party won the highest percentage of the vote with 21.4 %. These elections were first, in which this party managed to lead in Luxembourg-wide elections. Also these elections were the first, in which the Christian Social People's Party lost to the Democratic Party in Luxembourg-wide elections.

Electoral system
The six representatives to the European Parliament are elected in a single constituency, similar to in elections for the Chamber of Deputies. Each voter could either select a party list or distribute six votes (with up to two to a single candidate), with the final seat tally calculated by a Hagenbach-Bischoff quota.

In addition to Luxembourgish citizens, voting was open to European Union citizens resident in Luxembourg. Voting is compulsory for all eligible enrolled voters who are under 75 years of age.

Results

References 

Luxembourg
2019 in Luxembourg
European Parliament elections in Luxembourg